Jumla Sign Language is a village sign language of the town of Jumla in western Nepal.  There is a Nepalese Sign Language school in Jumla, and that the students come from a 1–2-day walk away and do not speak Jumla Sign Language.

See also
Jhankot Sign Language
Ghandruk Sign Language
Maunabudhuk–Bodhe Sign Language

References

Village sign languages
Sign languages of Nepal
Languages of Karnali Province